Olga Krizova V.D.B. (born 1950) is a Slovak Volunteer of Don Bosco and an academic. Krizova is one of the first seven women appointed to the Congregation for Institutes of Consecrated Life and Societies of Apostolic Life, the second highest-ranking department of the Roman Curia, the administrative institution of the Holy See. She became a member of the Congregation of Consecrated Life on 8 July 2019, when she was appointed by Pope Francis.

Born in 1950 in Bratislava, then Czechoslovakia, she entered the Secular Institute of Volunteers of Don Bosco in 1970. She was elected to the leadership of the Institute, as Moderator General, on 25 July 2007.

References 

1950 births
Living people
People from Bratislava
Slovak women academics
Women officials of the Roman Curia
Sisters of Don Bosco
Members of the Congregation for Institutes of Consecrated Life and Societies of Apostolic Life